The 41st Guldbagge Awards ceremony, presented by the Swedish Film Institute, honored the best Swedish films of 2005, and took place on 30 January 2006. Nina's Journey directed by Lena Einhorn was presented with the award for Best Film.

Winner and nominees

Awards

See also
 78th Academy Awards
 63rd Golden Globe Awards
 59th British Academy Film Awards
 12th Screen Actors Guild Awards
 11th Critics' Choice Awards
 26th Golden Raspberry Awards

References

External links
Official website
Guldbaggen on Facebook
Guldbaggen on Twitter

2006 in Sweden
2005 film awards
Guldbagge Awards ceremonies
2000s in Stockholm
January 2006 events in Europe